South Yorkshire is a ceremonial and metropolitan county in the Yorkshire and Humber Region of England. The county has four council areas which are the cities of Doncaster and Sheffield as well as the boroughs of Barnsley and Rotherham. 

In Northern England, it is on the east side of the Pennines. Part of the Peak District national park is in the county. The River Don flows through most of the county, which is landlocked.

The county had a population of 1.34 million in 2011. Sheffield, its largest urban centre, lies in the south west of the county. The built-up area around Sheffield and Rotherham, with over half the county's population living within it, is the tenth most populous in the United Kingdom.

The majority of the county was formerly governed as part of the county of Yorkshire, the former county remains as a cultural region. The county was created on 1 April 1974, under the Local Government Act 1972. It was created from 32 local government districts of the West Riding of Yorkshire (the administrative county and four county boroughs) and small areas from Derbyshire and Nottinghamshire. South Yorkshire County Council was abolished in 1986, multiple bodies took over the roles which make it a metropolitan county, such as a passenger transport executive, most of which were later absorbed into the South Yorkshire Mayoral Combined Authority.

History

Although the modern county of South Yorkshire was not created until 1974, the history of its constituent settlements and parts goes back centuries. Prehistoric remains include a Mesolithic "house" (a circle of stones in the shape of a hut-base) dating to around 8000 BC, found at Deepcar, in the northern part of Sheffield. The region was on the frontier of the Roman Empire during the Roman period.

The main settlements of South Yorkshire grew up around the industries of mining and steel manufacturing. The main mining industry was coal which was concentrated to the north and east of the county. There were also iron deposits which were mined in the area. The rivers running off the Pennines to the west of the county supported the steel industry that is concentrated in Sheffield, Stocksbridge and Rotherham.  The proximity of the iron and coal also made this an ideal place for steel manufacture.

Although Christian nonconformism was never as strong in South Yorkshire as in the mill towns of West Yorkshire, there are still many Methodist and Baptist churches in the area.  Also, South Yorkshire has a relatively high number of followers of spiritualism. It is the only county that counts as a full region in the Spiritualists' National Union.

Redcliffe-Maud Report

The Local Government Commission for England presented draft recommendations, in December 1965, proposing a new county—York and North Midlands—roughly centred on the southern part of the West Riding of Yorkshire and northern parts of Derbyshire and Nottinghamshire. The review was abolished in favour of the Royal Commission on Local Government before it was able to issue a final report.

The Royal Commission's 1969 report, known as the Redcliffe-Maud Report, proposed the removal of much of the then existing system of local government. The commission described the system of administering urban and rural districts separately as outdated, noting that urban areas provided employment and services for rural dwellers, and open countryside was used by town dwellers for recreation.

Redcliffe-Maud's recommendations were accepted by the Labour government in February 1970. Although the Redcliffe-Maud Report was rejected by the Conservative government after the 1970 general election, there was a commitment to local government reform, and the idea of a metropolitan county of South Yorkshire.

After 1974
The Local Government Act 1972 reformed local government in England by creating a system of two-tier metropolitan and non-metropolitan counties and districts throughout the country. The act formally established South Yorkshire on 1 April 1974, although South Yorkshire County Council (SYCC) had been running since elections in 1973. The leading article in The Times on the day the Local Government Act came into effect noted that the "new arrangement is a compromise which seeks to reconcile familiar geography which commands a certain amount of affection and loyalty, with the scale of operations on which modern planning methods can work effectively".

South Yorkshire initially had a two tier structure of local government with a strategic-level county council and four districts providing most services.

In 1974, as part of the South Yorkshire Structure Plan of the environment, conservation and land use, South Yorkshire County Council commissioned a public attitudes survey covering job opportunities, educational facilities, leisure opportunities, health and medical services, shopping centres and transport in the county.

In 1986, throughout England the metropolitan county councils were abolished. The functions of the county council were devolved to the boroughs; joint-boards covering fire, police and public transport; and to other special joint arrangements. The joint boards continue to function and include the South Yorkshire Passenger Transport Executive. The South Yorkshire Police and Crime Commissioner also oversees South Yorkshire Police.

Although the county council was abolished, South Yorkshire remains a metropolitan and ceremonial county with a Lord Lieutenant of South Yorkshire and  a High Sheriff.

Geography
The metropolitan county borders Derbyshire, West Yorkshire, North Yorkshire, the East Riding of Yorkshire, Lincolnshire and Nottinghamshire.
The terrain of the county is mostly distinguished by the Pennines and its foothills which rise in the west of the county and gradually descend into the Humberhead Levels in the east of the county. Geologically, the county lies largely on the carboniferous rocks of the Yorkshire coalfield in the outer Pennine fringes, producing a rolling landscape with hills, escarpments and broad valleys. In this landscape, there is widespread evidence of both current and former industrial activity. There are numerous mine buildings, former spoil heaps and iron and steel plants. The scenery is a mixture of built up areas, industrial land with some dereliction, and farmed open country. Ribbon developments along transport routes including canal, road and rail are prominent features of the area although some remnants of the pre industrial landscape and semi-natural vegetation still survive. 

The Pennines in the west of the county are mostly inside the Peak District National Park and also contain carboniferous rocks, with the underlying geology primarily being millstone grit sandstones of the Dark Peak rising from the Yorkshire coalfield and the terrain is mostly moorland plateaus and gritstone edges. The inner Pennine fringes  between the Dark Peak and Yorkshire coalfield are distinguished by many steep valleys, and a transition from uplands and rural landscape to lowlands and urban landscape towards the east of the county. Major rivers which cross the area are the Dearne, Rother and Don. To the east, in the Doncaster area the landscape becomes flatter as the eastward dipping carboniferous rocks of the coalfield are overlain by the lacustrine deposits of the Humberhead Levels.

Green belt

South Yorkshire contains green belt throughout the county, surrounding its four districts to large extents. It was first drawn up from the 1950s. The western edge of the Sheffield and Barnsley districts directly form with the boundary of the Peak District National Park.

Settlements

The table below outlines many of the county's settlements, and is formatted according to their metropolitan borough.

Of these settlements above, South Yorkshire has three main urban areas: the Dearne Valley which covers Barnsley and surrounding area; the Sheffield urban area which covers Sheffield, Rotherham and surrounding area; and the Doncaster urban area which covers Doncaster and surrounding area.

Governance

The South Yorkshire County Council was abolished and its districts effectively became unitary authorities; they are the City of Sheffield, the City of Doncaster, the Metropolitan Borough of Barnsley and the Metropolitan Borough of Rotherham.

In 1986, throughout England the metropolitan county councils were abolished. The ceremonial county with a Lord Lieutenant of South Yorkshire and  a High Sheriff was retained. The county remains defined as metropolitan, functions of the county council devolved to the boroughs with many functions administered by joint authorities (such a passenger transport executive) containing representatives of the four councils. 

The South Yorkshire Mayoral Combined Authority was established in 2014 to bring the leaders of the four councils to give the county a main statutory body. It is led by the directly elected Mayor of South Yorkshire.

In the 2016 referendum on the United Kingdom's membership of the European Union, South Yorkshire voted 62% leave and 38% remain, making it one of the most heavily Leave areas in the country.

Economy
As one of the least prosperous areas in Western Europe, South Yorkshire has been targeted for funding from the European Regional Development Fund. This is a chart of trend of regional gross value added of South Yorkshire at current basic prices  with figures in millions of British Pounds Sterling.

However, the county has experienced a recent growth in the services sector. In the FDI European Cities and Regions of the Future 2022/23 Awards, Doncaster was ranked the best small city in Europe for investment.

Places of interest

Abbeydale Industrial Hamlet, Sheffield 
Brodsworth Hall and Gardens 
Cannon Hall Museum, Park & Gardens, Barnsley 
Chapel of Our Lady of Rotherham Bridge ("Chapel on the Bridge"), Rotherham
Clifton Park Museum, Rotherham 
Conisbrough Castle 
Cusworth Hall 
Doncaster Minster 
Doncaster Mansion House
Elsecar Steam Railway 
Howden Moors 
Kelham Island Museum, Sheffield 
Magna Science Adventure Centre
Meadowhall Centre, Sheffield
Monk Bretton Priory 
Pot House Hamlet
Sheffield Winter Gardens 
Roche Abbey  
Rotherham Minster
Rother Valley Country Park 
RSPB Old Moor Wetland Centre
Sheffield Cathedral
Ulley Reservoir & Country park 
Wentworth Castle & Gardens, Barnsley 
Wentworth Woodhouse 
Weston Park Museum & Mappin Art Gallery, Sheffield 
Woodlands model village
Worsborough Mill and Country Park 
Wortley Top Forge
Yorkshire Wildlife Park

References

External links

 
 Images of South Yorkshire  at the English Heritage Archive
 
 South Yorkshire Police

 
Metropolitan counties
Metropolitan areas of England
Counties of England established in 1974